Cangzhou is a prefecture-level city in eastern Hebei province, People's Republic of China. At the 2020 census, Cangzhou's built-up (or metro) area made of Yunhe, Xinhua districts and Cang County largely being conurbated had a population of 1,421,843 inhabitants, while the prefecture-level administrative unit in total has a population of 7,300,783.

History

Cangzhou is reported to have been founded in the Southern and Northern Dynasties period (420−589 CE).

Administrative divisions
Cangzhou City comprises 2 districts, 4 county-level cities, 9 counties and 1 autonomous county.

Economics
Cangzhou's urban center is a heavily industrial city, but the city's administrative territory also includes strongly agricultural areas, and is well known in China for its Chinese jujubes (Chinese dates) and pear (widely known under the export name of Tianjin Ya Pear). The North China Oil Field is within Cangzhou City's jurisdiction. Cangzhou also encompasses a large fishing port and the coal-exporting Huanghua Harbour.

Geography and transportation

Cangzhou is located in eastern Hebei, immediately to the south of Tianjin, near the coast of the Bohai Sea of the Pacific Ocean. Bordering prefecture-level cities are Hengshui to the southwest, Baoding to the west, and Langfang to the north. It lies on the Beijing–Shanghai Railway.

The G1811 Huanghua–Shijiazhuang Expressway connects Cangzhou to Shijiazhuang, the provincial capital, and is linked to Beijing via both the G2 Beijing–Shanghai Expressway and G3 Beijing–Taipei Expressway, which are concurrent within the province, and to Shanghai via G2. Cangzhou's Huanghua Harbour is the end of a main Chinese coal shipping railway, the Shuohuang Railway. Other major highways serving Cangzhou's urban area are China National Highway 104 and 307.

Major airports located closest to Cangzhou include Beijing Capital Airport and Tianjin Airport.

The Grand Canal passes directly through Cangzhou, and a district of Cangzhou (Yunhe District) is named after it.

Climate
Cangzhou has a four-season, monsoon-influenced humid continental climate/semi-arid climate (Köppen BSk/Dwa), with cold, dry winters, and hot, humid summers. A majority of the annual precipitation of  occurs in July and August alone. With possible monthly percent possible sunshine ranging from 49% in July to 65% in October, the city receives 2,663 hours of bright sunshine annually.

Culture

The city has historically been known in China for its wushu (Chinese martial arts) and acrobatics (specifically, the Wu Qiao school). Cangzhou is also famed for its historic thousand-year-old 40-ton sculpture, the Iron Lion of Cangzhou. The sculpture is reportedly the largest cast-iron sculpture in the world, cast in 953 in the Five Dynasties and Ten Kingdoms period.  The famed lion has even given its name to a locally brewed beer (iron lion beer, 铁狮啤酒) and is a symbol of the city.

Cangzhou is home to a traditional Chinese form of musical performing arts, Kuaiban Dagu.

The city hosts seven mosques for Muslim adherents (mostly Hui). One of them, the West Mosque, has collected at its museum one of China's best collections of Islamic manuscripts and artefacts.

Demographics and society
Cangzhou, though predominated by the Han Chinese majority, is home to a sizable population of the Muslim Hui minority. Intermarriage occasionally occurs between the majority Han and the Hui, but stereotypes of Hui still exist among Cangzhou's Han residents, and some tensions remain. Migration to Hebei province and Cangzhou by Xinjiang Muslim minorities (generally ethnic Uighurs) is increasing.

Language
The dominant first language of Cangzhou's population is a variety of the northeastern Mandarin dialect continuum termed Cangzhou, and is a variety of Ji Lu Mandarin. There are some similarities with the Tianjin variety and the Baoding variety of Mandarin, but both are considered distinct groups from that of Cangzhou . Dialects of the Cangzhou area vary between localities and counties, though are generally intelligible among each other.

Municipal government
The city, like all other Chinese administrative divisions, has a party committee, the People's government, the People's Congress, and the Political consultative conference.

Military
Cangzhou is home to the Cangzhou Airbase of the People's Liberation Army Air Force

Sports 
Shijiazhuang Ever Bright moved to Cangzhou and changed their name to Cangzhou Mighty Lions, they play at the Cangzhou Stadium.

Education
Cangzhou Normal University: now it has 871 teacher staff, including 607 full-time teachers, 233 people with the title of deputy senior or above, and 405 people with master's and doctor's degrees. The school motto is "knowing, morality, knowledge and behaviour, innovation".

There is one international school in Cangzhou, the Cangzhou Zhenhua Korean International School.

Notable residents
Sun Yue (1985), fifth Chinese national to play in the NBA
Wang Zi-Ping (1881–1973), Chinese martial arts grandmaster

References

DuBois, Thomas. The Sacred Village: Social Change and Religious Life in Rural North China. Honolulu: University of Hawaii Press, 2005.

External links
Article about the Cangzhou Lion (in Chinese)
"Chinese 'serial killer' arrested". BBC World Service. 15 November 2003. (Incident in Cangzhou)

 
Cities in Hebei
Prefecture-level divisions of Hebei